Shanelle Porter (born January 20, 1972, in Vallejo, California) is a retired American sprinter who specialized in the 400 metres.

Her personal best time is 50.67 seconds, achieved in July 1996 in Lignano, Italy.

Achievements

References
 Shanelle Porter at USATF
 

1972 births
Living people
American female sprinters
University of Nebraska–Lincoln alumni
Pan American Games medalists in athletics (track and field)
Pan American Games silver medalists for the United States
Sportspeople from Vallejo, California
Athletes (track and field) at the 1999 Pan American Games
World Athletics Indoor Championships medalists
Medalists at the 1999 Pan American Games
21st-century American women